Chak 31/1-AL is a village that situated near Renala Khurd about 8 km near Shergarh town of district of Okara. The village dates back to the 1900s.

Villages in Okara District